Jim Gilmour (30 April 1891 – 1 October 1963) was a British boxer. He competed in the men's lightweight event at the 1920 Summer Olympics.

References

1891 births
1963 deaths
British male boxers
Olympic boxers of Great Britain
Boxers at the 1920 Summer Olympics
Place of birth missing
Lightweight boxers